Matthew Bishop (born 11 July 1975) is a former Australian rules footballer who played in the Australian Football League (AFL).

Bishop started out with the Melbourne Demons after being elevated from their rookie list in 1998. He played in Port Adelaide's 2004 premiership team.

Playing statistics

|-
|- style="background-color: #EAEAEA"
! scope="row" style="text-align:center" | 1998
|style="text-align:center;"|
| 48 || 10 || 3 || 2 || 54 || 30 || 84 || 24 || 4 || 0.3 || 0.2 || 5.4 || 3.0 || 8.4 || 2.4 || 0.4
|-
! scope="row" style="text-align:center" | 1999
|style="text-align:center;"|
| 18 || 8 || 1 || 1 || 47 || 16 || 63 || 19 || 2 || 0.1 || 0.1 || 5.9 || 2.0 || 7.9 || 2.4 || 0.3
|- style="background-color: #EAEAEA"
! scope="row" style="text-align:center" | 2000
|style="text-align:center;"|
| 4 || 14 || 0 || 2 || 83 || 44 || 127 || 31 || 8 || 0.0 || 0.1 || 5.9 || 3.1 || 9.1 || 2.2 || 0.6
|-
! scope="row" style="text-align:center" | 2001
|style="text-align:center;"|
| 19 || 11 || 0 || 0 || 61 || 21 || 82 || 35 || 12 || 0.0 || 0.0 || 5.5 || 1.9 || 7.5 || 3.2 || 1.1
|- style="background-color: #EAEAEA"
! scope="row" style="text-align:center" | 2002
|style="text-align:center;"|
| 19 || 25 || 2 || 3 || 212 || 72 || 284 || 118 || 19 || 0.1 || 0.1 || 8.5 || 2.9 || 11.4 || 4.7 || 0.8
|-
! scope="row" style="text-align:center" | 2003
|style="text-align:center;"|
| 19 || 22 || 0 || 1 || 160 || 74 || 234 || 112 || 17 || 0.0 || 0.0 || 7.3 || 3.4 || 10.6 || 5.1 || 0.8
|- style="background-color: #EAEAEA"
! scope="row" style="text-align:center" | 2004
|style="text-align:center;"|
| 19 || 24 || 0 || 0 || 172 || 105 || 277 || 109 || 27 || 0.0 || 0.0 || 7.2 || 4.4 || 11.5 || 4.5 || 1.1
|-
! scope="row" style="text-align:center" | 2005
|style="text-align:center;"|
| 19 || 20 || 2 || 0 || 142 || 77 || 219 || 92 || 10 || 0.1 || 0.0 || 7.1 || 3.9 || 11.0 || 4.6 || 0.5
|- style="background-color: #EAEAEA"
! scope="row" style="text-align:center" | 2006
|style="text-align:center;"|
| 19 || 16 || 0 || 0 || 101 || 59 || 160 || 59 || 11 || 0.0 || 0.0 || 6.3 || 3.7 || 10.0 || 3.7 || 0.7
|- class="sortbottom"
! colspan=3| Career
! 150
! 8
! 9
! 1032
! 498
! 1530
! 599
! 110
! 0.1
! 0.1
! 6.9
! 3.3
! 10.2
! 4.0
! 0.7
|}

References

External links 

DemonWiki profile

Port Adelaide Football Club players
Port Adelaide Football Club Premiership players
Port Adelaide Football Club players (all competitions)
Melbourne Football Club players
Box Hill Football Club players
Australian rules footballers from Victoria (Australia)
1975 births
Living people
One-time VFL/AFL Premiership players